The Emerald Island is a phantom island reported to lie between Australia and Antarctica and south of Macquarie Island. It was first sighted by the British sealing ship Emerald, captained by William Elliot, in December 1821, and the name of the supposed island is derived from the name of this ship.

No trace of the island was found by the 1840 United States Exploring Expedition. Although a captain visiting Port Chalmers reported seeing it sometime before 1890, a search by the Nimrod in 1909 turned up nothing. Nevertheless, it appeared on a map as late as 1987 in a desk calendar book (with atlas) published by American Express.

The abyssal plain on the ocean floor beneath the supposed location of this phantom island is named Emerald Basin.

See also
 Royal Company's Islands
 Nimrod Islands
 Dougherty Island

References

Reference in an 1882 paper of the Transactions of the Royal Society of New Zealand
Tectonic implications of fault-scarp–derived volcaniclastic deposits on Macquarie Island: Sedimentation at a fossil ridge-transform intersection?

Phantom subantarctic islands